Theo (or Theodore or Theodorus) van Gogh is the name of:
Theo van Gogh (art dealer) (1857–1891), brother of the painter Vincent van Gogh
Theo van Gogh (film director) (1957–2004), great-grandson of the above